Green Eyes is a 1934 American Pre-Code Chesterfield Pictures film directed by Richard Thorpe.

Plot
During a masked party Stephen Kester (Claude Gillingwater) is found dead in the closet of his room, three stab wounds in his back. Suspicion falls on everyone at the party, especially Kester's granddaughter Jean (Shirley Grey) and her fiancé Cliff Miller (William Bakewell), who fled the house after disabling all of the other cars and cutting the phone lines. As Inspector Crofton (John Wray) and Detective Regan (Ben Hendricks Jr.) investigate they are shadowed and helped along by a mystery writer, Bill Tracy (Charles Starrett).

Cast
Shirley Grey as Jean Kester
Charles Starrett as Bill Tracy
Claude Gillingwater as Stephen Kester
John Wray as Inspector Crofton
William Bakewell as Cliff Miller
Dorothy Revier as Mrs. Pritchard
Ben Hendricks Jr. as Detective Regan
Alden Chase as Mr. Pritchard
Arthur Clayton as Roger Hall
Aggie Herring as Dora, housekeeper for the Kesters
Edward Keane as Raynor
Edward Le Saint as Banker
Robert Frazer as Broker

References

External links

1934 films
1934 mystery films
American black-and-white films
American mystery films
Chesterfield Pictures films
1930s English-language films
Films based on American novels
Films based on mystery novels
Films directed by Richard Thorpe
1930s American films